Paolo DelPiccolo (born May 28, 1991) is an American soccer player who plays as a midfielder for Louisville City FC in the United Soccer League. He is also the club's current captain.

Career

College and amateur
DelPiccolo played four years of college soccer at the University of Louisville between 2009 and 2012.

Professional career
DelPiccolo was drafted 27th overall by Montreal Impact in the 2013 MLS SuperDraft. However, he opted to move abroad and signed with Eintracht Frankfurt in January 2013.

DelPiccolo was released by Frankfurt at the end of their 2012–13 season and signed with Montreal Impact on July 5, 2013. He was waived at the end of the season by Montreal without making a first team appearance and was subsequently signed by New England Revolution in the MLS Waiver Draft on November 25, 2013. However, DelPiccolo was waived by New England just before the start of the 2014 MLS season on March 10, 2014.

On April 10, 2014, DelPiccolo signed with USL Pro club Arizona United. On January 22, 2015, DelPiccolo signed with the Charlotte Independence.

DelPiccolo signed with USL's Louisville City FC on February 2, 2016. On March 22, 2022, DelPiccolo became just the 12th player in USL Championship history to reach 200 regular season appearances during a 1–1 draw against Indy Eleven.

Honors

Club
Louisville City FC
USL Cup (2): 2017, 2018

Individual
USL Cup Final MVP: 2017

Personal life
As of March 2020, DelPiccolo is in a relationship with Katie George, a former University of Louisville volleyball player and Miss Kentucky USA and current journalist with the ACC Network.

References

External links 

 
 
 

1991 births
Living people
American soccer players
American expatriate soccer players
Association football midfielders
Charlotte Independence players
Eintracht Frankfurt II players
Louisville Cardinals men's soccer players
Louisville City FC players
CF Montréal draft picks
CF Montréal players
New England Revolution players
People from Wheat Ridge, Colorado
Phoenix Rising FC players
Soccer players from Colorado
USL Championship players
American expatriate soccer players in Germany
Louisville City FC coaches
USL Championship coaches
Sportspeople from the Denver metropolitan area